Doukissa Nomikou (Greek: Δούκισσα Νομικού: born November 7, 1986) is a Greek TV presenter and model. 
She was crowned Star Hellas 2007 and represented her country at the Miss Universe pageant in Mexico.

From 2012 to 2017 she was the co-presenter of the TV show OLA next to Themos Anastasiadis. Also, she presented the Greek versions of shows Dancing with the Stars and So You Think You Can Dance.

Since 2017, is the ambassador of L'Oreal Paris. In September 2018, she participated in Paris Fashion Week for the Le Défilé Fashion Show of L'Oreal Paris with Doutzen Kroes and Eva Longoria. Since 2018, is also ambassador of organization Mazi Gia To Paidi, which helps poor kids and their families.

Early life
Nomikou was born on November 7, 1986, in Athens to singer Nikos Nomikos and Anastasia Nomikou (née Piperopoulou). Her mother is German-Greek and her father is Greek from Schoinousa. She has an older brother, Nikitas (born 1985), who is economist. After school, she studied at Economical University of Athens and graduated in 2014. Along with her studies, began her modeling career with Cristy Crana's agency.

Career

Television
On May 3, 2007, Nomikou participated in ANT1's beauty pageant and she crowned Miss Star Hellas. After that, she represented Greece in Miss Universe beauty pageant in Mexico. 
In 2008, Nomikou did her debut as TV presenter, with TV show LifeStyle on Alter Channel, where she was co-presenter of Nikos Papadakis. The next season she was a cast member of Omorfos kosmos to proi as co-presenter of Grigoris Arnaoutoglou with Katerina Kainourgiou, Dimitris Ouggarezos and Maria Arabatzi. In 2009, she did a guest appearance on the series I Polykatoikia and was the ambassador of Veet creams. In 2010–2011 Nomikou was the presenter of green room on talent show Just The 2 Of Us, where the main presenter was Giorgos Kapoutzidis. In October 2011, she began to present again the TV show LifeStyle but the project ended because of the channel's economic problems.

In 2012, Nomikou went to channel ANT1 and she began to present the TV show Laugh Attack with Panagiotis Chatzidakis. From 2012 to 2017 she was the co-presenter of the TV show Laugh Attack next to Themos Anastasiadis and Vaggelis Perris. In 2014 worked with company Johnson's Radiant Essentials for its commercials.  From 2013 to 2015, she presented the Greek version of Dancing with the Stars. From autumn 2015 to winter 2016, she presented the TV show Joy but stopped because problems with the production. After that, in spring 2017, Nomikou presented the Greek version of talent show So You Think You Can Dance. The judges were Eleni Foureira, Ioannis Melissanidis, Konstantinos Rigos and Panos Metaxopoulos.

Since 2021, she hosts the show Super Makeover on Skai TV. In the show includes also four experts, make up expert Pantelis Toutountzis, fashion stylist expert Elena Papastavrou, hair stylist expert Sofia Nomikou and the counseling psychologist expert Maria Houdalaki. In 2021, on the same channel, Nomikou hosted only the live shows of the seventh season of the show The Voice of Greece, where the host of the show Giorgos Lianos, could not present the show, because he was absent in the Dominican Republic, where he was presenting the eighth season of the show Survivor Greece.

Theatre and Cinema
Her theatre debut as an actress was in 2014, when she played the role of Beautiful Helen in theatrical play Troikos Polemos (Trojan War) with Andinoos Albanis.

In cinema, Nomikou has appeared in two movies. I Limouzina (2014) and I Kori Tou Rebrant (2015).

Personal life
In 2014, Nomikou began dating entrepreneur Dimitris Theodoridis, who is Savvas Theodoridis's son. Three years later, on June 10, 2017, they married in Mykonos. 
On March 25, 2018, Nomikou gave birth to their first child, a son, Savvas Theodoridis and on September 26, 2019, gave birth to their second child, a daughter, Anastasia Theodoridi.

Filmography

Television

Theater

Cinema

References

External links

 

Greek female models
Miss Universe 2007 contestants
Living people
1986 births
Greek beauty pageant winners
Models from Athens
Mass media people from Athens